Gallup Glacier is a broad glacier, about  long, flowing east between Mount Rosenwald and Mount Black to enter Shackleton Glacier, Antarctica, just north of Matador Mountain. It was named by the Advisory Committee on Antarctic Names after Commander F.S. Gallup, Jr., U.S. Navy, Commanding Officer of Squadron VX-6 during Operation Deep Freeze 1965.

See also
 List of glaciers in the Antarctic
 Glaciology

References

Glaciers of Dufek Coast